Opportunity Knocks is a 1990 American comedy film starring Dana Carvey. It was directed by Donald Petrie.

Synopsis
Con men Eddie Farrell and Lou Pesquino need cash fast and pretend to be repair men sent to fix a gas leak. The con fails, but they escape.

Eddie and Lou find an empty house that they decide to burglarize. When they learn from a message on the answering machine that the owner is out of the country and the man who was going to house-sit can't make it, they spend the night.

The next day, Eddie and Lou are on the run from thugs sent by local gangster Sal Nichols, to whom they owe money. After they find themselves separated, Eddie takes refuge in the empty house.

In the morning, Eddie walks out of the shower and meets Mona Malkin, whose son owns the house. She assumes Eddie is her son's friend Jonathan Albertson, the one supposed to house-sit. Eddie plays along, meeting Mona's businessman husband Milt, who offers him a job.

Eddie decides to run a "love con" on Milt's daughter Annie in order to gain access to Milt's money. However, Lou is captured by Nichols.

Eddie and his aunt Connie and uncle Max conspire to get Nichols off their backs for good. Along the way, Eddie falls in love with Annie.

Cast
 Dana Carvey as Eddie Farrell
 Robert Loggia as Milt Malkin
 Todd Graff as Lou Pesquino
 Julia Campbell as Dr. Annie Malkin
 Milo O'Shea as Max
 James Tolkan as Sal Nichols
 Doris Belack as Mona Malkin
 Sally Gracie as Connie
 Mike Bacarella as Pinkie
 John M. Watson, Sr. as Harold Monroe
 Beatrice Fredman as Bubbie
 Thomas McElroy as Men's Room Attendant
 Gene Honda as Japanese Businessman
 Del Close as Williamson
 Michelle Johnston as Club Singer
 Lorna Raver as Eddie's Secretary
 Judith Scott as Milt's Secretary

Reception

Box office
The film was not a success and earned $11 million against a production budget of $13 million. The film's original teaser trailer involved Carvey's Saturday Night Live character The Church Lady, though she does not appear in the film.

Critical response
On Rotten Tomatoes the film has a score of 11% based on reviews from 9 critics.

Soundtrack
The song "Cruel, Crazy, Beautiful World" by Johnny Clegg is featured over the end credits.

References

External links 
 
 
 
 
 

1990 films
1990 comedy films
American comedy films
Films set in Chicago
1990s English-language films
Universal Pictures films
Imagine Entertainment films
Films directed by Donald Petrie
Films scored by Miles Goodman
Films produced by Chris Meledandri
Films about con artists
1990s American films